Martin Adam Friedman (born December 8, 1962) is an American guitarist, best known for his tenure as the lead guitarist for thrash metal band Megadeth from 1990 to 2000. He is also known for playing alongside Jason Becker in Cacophony from 1986 until 1989, as well as his 13 solo albums and tours. Friedman has resided in Tokyo, Japan since 2003, where he has appeared on over 700 Japanese television programs such as Rock Fujiyama, Hebimeta-san, Kōhaku Uta Gassen and Jukebox English. He has released albums with several record labels, including Avex Trax, Universal, EMI, Prosthetic, and Shrapnel Records.

Early career (1982–1989)
At the age of 14, after attending a KISS concert, Friedman took up the guitar, and is largely self-taught. He rushed to form a band and started playing original songs, the reason being that originals are easier to play than covers. "Because," he says, "even if you screw up, you just claim that the song is written like that and no one can challenge you." The mother of one of Friedman's friends ran an event center with a two-level stage, and Friedman and his friends used it as a rehearsal space. Soon word spread about their band, and, since they were in a rural area, people would come from miles around to socialize and listen to music. "Rehearsals" very quickly became live shows. Friedman formed and played lead guitar in several other bands, including Deuce, Hawaii (which had previously been called Vixen), and notably Cacophony. Cacophony featured neoclassical metal elements and synchronized twin guitar harmonies and counterpoints shared with guitarist Jason Becker. He played guitar on the 1989 album In Your Face by Christian rock band Shout. In 1988, he recorded demos for Jet Red that eventually were released as bonus tracks on the 2009 Jet Red release "Flight Plan". In August 1988, he released his first solo album, Dragon's Kiss.

Megadeth (1990–2000)
When Cacophony disbanded in 1989, Friedman auditioned for the thrash metal band Megadeth after a tip from his friend Bob Nalbandian. Friedman officially joined Megadeth in February 1990. Friedman's audition can be seen on the Megadeth DVD Arsenal of Megadeth. The first album he recorded with them was Rust in Peace, which was released on September 24, 1990. Rust in Peace was certified platinum by the RIAA in 1994 and was nominated for the Best Metal Performance Grammy at the 33rd Grammy Awards.

Friedman further developed his style of playing exotic scale solos from the Cacophony era, and integrated it into the music of Megadeth. In July 1992, Megadeth released Countdown to Extinction, which was a more commercial album, aimed at a wider audience, and sold double platinum. Friedman played on Megadeth's further releases Youthanasia (1994), Cryptic Writings (1997), and Risk (1999). After a total of five studio albums with Megadeth, in December 1999 Friedman announced his departure from Megadeth. His last show with the band was on January 14, 2000 at the Moore Theatre in Seattle. Friedman later stated that he got tired of "holding the flag" for traditional metal and felt that he could not evolve as a musician. In an interview with Ultimate-Guitar.com in March 2007, Friedman claimed that he wanted Megadeth to move towards a more aggressive sound and that he'd rather have been playing straight pop music than the pop-influenced metal Megadeth was playing at the time. During Friedman's time in the band, they sold over ten million albums worldwide.

During his time in Megadeth, Friedman released three solo albums between 1992 and 1996, which featured Megadeth bandmate Nick Menza on drums.

Friedman reunited with Megadeth for the songs "Countdown to Extinction", "Tornado of Souls" and "Symphony of Destruction" at the Nippon Budokan in Tokyo on February 27, 2023.

In Japan and recent work

Friedman appeared on the Tourniquet albums Where Moth and Rust Destroy (2003) and Antiseptic Bloodbath (2012), and Tourniquet drummer Ted Kirkpatrick's solo album Onward to Freedom

In 2003, Friedman collaborated with Nanase Aikawa on her third mini album R.U.O.K.  In 2021 he toured with Aikawa on her 25th anniversary concert tour.

In 2009, Friedman collaborated with Ema Gelotte and Tinna Karlsdotter from "All Ends" as the lead guitarist for the song "With Me", which was featured in the game, Sonic and the Black Knight. In 2010, Friedman launched a record label under Avex Group, called Gokukara Records.
In February 2010, during C. J. Ramone's Japan tour, he made a guest appearance on guitar for "California Sun", a cover song previously released by The Ramones on their 1977 album, Leave Home.

In 2011, Friedman collaborated with Japanese idol  group Momoiro Clover Z, providing guitar for their song "Mōretsu Uchū Kōkyōkyoku Dai 7 Gakushō "Mugen no Ai"", which would become a hit in 2012.

In 2011, Friedman  worked with Ayanocozey Show to make the song SAMURAI STRONG STYLE, theme of the Tokusatsu movie Kamen Rider × Kamen Rider Fourze & OOO: Movie War Mega Max. Friedman and Ayanocozey had previously worked together when they joined the Japanese promotional super-group FANTA, releasing the 2010 single "Fantastic Love". Friedman stood for the "F" in FANTA, Ayanocozey stood for the first "A", and the other members of the group made up the other letters.

Friedman recorded with Daniel Tompkins of Tesseract in Tompkins' band Skyharbor's debut album, Blinding White Noise. At the end of 2012, a full album containing heavy metal covers of Momoiro Clover Z's songs was also released by a band named "Metal Clone X". Although band members remained anonymous, Friedman was cited as label producer and arranger.

In 2013, Friedman released his first library of guitar loops on LoopArtists. Friedman recorded collections of clean-tone, high gain lead and rhythm guitar loops that are intended for use in a production and remix environment. Friedman has been doing concert tours for the Bravely Default original soundtrack in 2013 as well as the Budokan concert tours among others. In combination with these tours he has also released his new album Inferno in 2014 which he is now touring across Europe going to places such as Norway, Poland, Netherlands and Germany.

In 2014, Friedman collaborated again with Momoiro Clover Z, providing the guitar track for their single "Moon Pride". The song was also used as the opening theme music for the television series Sailor Moon Crystal, which premiered in July that year.

In 2018, he collaborated with Man with a Mission's Jean-Ken Johnny, KenKen, and Kōji Fujimoto for the song "The Perfect World", which was used as main theme for the Netflix original anime series B: The Beginning.

In February of 2023, he rejoined his former band Megadeth to play live for the first time in 23 years at Budokan in Tokyo, Japan. Following his three song reunion with Megadeth, rumors of a possible reunion began circulating.

Television
Friedman appears on Japanese television and is also a contributing columnist to Japanese music magazines and national newspapers. Speaking Japanese, he became a regular member of the cast of TXN's musical TV program Hebimeta-san (ヘビメタさん) (anglicized as "Mr. Heavy-Metal") with Japanese idol Yoko Kumada until the show came to an end in 2005. Friedman had his own heavy metal TV program called Rock Fujiyama alongside Shelly, Ken Ayugai (Kenny Guy), Yorimasa Hisatake (Rock Ninja Yorimasa) and ex-Scanch member Rolly Teranishi from April 2006 until March 2007. From November till December 2005, he toured with singer Ami Suzuki on her "Suzuki Ami Around the World" live house tour, which took place in Tokyo, Osaka and Nagoya.
Friedman was featured on Jukebox, a television program in which Friedman and two Japanese people translate the lyrics of various English songs into understandable Japanese. He has also made guest appearances on the television programs Eigo de Shabera Night and Tamori Club.
In 2008, Friedman played the role of Paul Weinberg, an English language teacher, in Isshin Inudou's Gou-Gou Datte Neko de Aru.

Friedman was a guest star in the Adult Swim original Metalocalypse by playing driving teacher Mr. Gojira. He has appeared on Cool Japan several times as a music expert.

In 2009, Friedman appeared on The Quiz Show, a Japanese TV drama starring Sho Sakurai as a guest professor. In January 2014, Friedman took part in New Japan Pro-Wrestling's Wrestle Kingdom 8 in Tokyo Dome event, playing Hiroshi Tanahashi to the arena.

Personal life
Friedman is of Jewish descent. He lives in the Shinjuku neighborhood of Tokyo.

Shortly after the 2011 Tōhoku earthquake and tsunami, Friedman began auctioning off a great variety of his musical equipment and paraphernalia that he used as a member of Megadeth and Cacophony, including some of the earliest productions of Jackson Kelly guitars and his signature Carvin V220.

In December 2012, Friedman married Japanese cellist Hiyori Okuda in Yokohama.

In 2018, Friedman confirmed that his hair is genuinely curly but hates it; he prefers to have it straight.

Guitar technique
Friedman is known for his improvisation and for fusing Eastern music with Western music and other styles, such as neoclassical, thrash metal and later progressive rock. When playing, he often uses arpeggiated chords and various customized scales and arpeggios, some of which relate to Asian (Chinese and Japanese), Middle Eastern and other exotic scales, which are different from the typical minor/major pentatonic and seven modes based on the Major scale.

As a right-handed guitarist, Friedman has an unorthodox picking technique; the angle in which his hand is clenched goes against the conventional palm mute frequently used by right-handed players in metal music. He also frequently utilizes upstrokes as opposed to downstrokes, especially on the B and high E strings. Rather than strictly picking from his elbow or wrist, Friedman will also pick moving his fingers—a technique known as "circle picking".

Friedman is critical of being called a shredder. He opined that the term is "a guy who plays fast meaningless shit all the time. Shredders are the guys in your friend’s basement who play insanely fast, and it just looks so mind-blowing and amazingly cool with their fingers flying all around the neck, but if you close your eyes and actually listen, what you hear is a pile of shit. You all know what I’m talking about."

Amplifiers and effects
Engl Signature Marty Friedman Inferno (current)
Fractal Audio Axe-FX II processor (current)
Engl Special Edition (former)
Engl Powerball (2011 tour)
Custom Audio Electronics CAE 3+ preamp (Countdown, Youthanasia albums and tours) (former)
 Soldano SLO-100 (custom rackmount with slave out and effects loop circa 1992, used in studio for both guitar and bass tracks)
Bogner Triple Giant #11/25 (Rust in Peace album and tour) (former)
Rocktron/Bradshaw RSB 11 controller
Crate Blue Voodoo (as power amp, former)
VHT 2150 power amp (former)
Maxon AF-9 Auto Wah

Discography

Hawaii

Shout

Cacophony

Megadeth

Tourniquet

Enzo and the Glory Ensemble

Solo

Guest appearances

References

External links

Rock Fujiyama official website 
Shrapnel Records official website

1962 births
20th-century American guitarists
American emigrants to Japan
American heavy metal guitarists
Avex Group artists
Cacophony (band) members
Explorers Club (band) members
Jewish American musicians
Jewish heavy metal musicians
Lead guitarists
Living people
Megadeth members
Musical groups from Shinjuku
People from Laurel, Maryland
Shout (band) members
Shrapnel Records artists